Malcolm Charles Moos (April 19, 1916 – January 28, 1982) was an American political scientist, speechwriter and academic administrator. He was a professor of Political Science at Johns Hopkins University for two decades. As a speechwriter, Moos wrote President Dwight Eisenhower's final warning about the influence of the military-industrial complex in 1961. Moos then served as the president of the University of Minnesota from 1967 to 1974.

Early life
Moos was born on April 19, 1916 in Saint Paul, Minnesota. He received his bachelor's and master's degrees in political science from the University of Minnesota. He went on to receive his doctorate, also in political science, from the University of California at Berkeley.

Career
Moos first taught at the University of Minnesota. He was a fellow at the University of California and a research assistant at the University of Alabama. He taught at the University of Wyoming in 1942, followed by Johns Hopkins University for 21 years. He was also an associate editor of the Baltimore Evening Sun.

Moos joined President Eisenhower's staff as a special assistant in 1957 and became his chief speech writer in 1958. Among the many speeches Moos wrote for President Eisenhower, he wrote Eisenhower's valedictory speech which warned of the influence of the military-industrial complex in 1961.

Moos taught Political Science at Columbia University for three years and he worked for the Rockefeller family for two years. He was director of policy and planning at the Ford Foundation from 1964 to 1967.

Moos served as the president of the University of Minnesota from 1967 to 1974. In 1967, Moos became the first native Minnesotan and alumnus to serve as a University of Minnesota president. During his tenure, Moos faced the rise of Civil rights and anti-war protests.

Moos was appointed as executive director at the Center for the Study of Democratic Institutions in Santa Barbara, California in 1974. He tried to run for the United States Senate as a Republican but failed to secure the nomination in 1978.

Personal life and death
Moos married Margaret Tracy Gager, and he had five children. He died in his sleep at his home in northern Minnesota in 1982. He was said to have a heart condition.

References

External links
Records of Malcolm C. Moos, Dwight D. Eisenhower Presidential Library
Finding aid for Malcolm Moos Oral History, Dwight D. Eisenhower Presidential Library

1916 births
1982 deaths
The Baltimore Sun people
American political scientists
American political writers
Eisenhower administration personnel
University of Minnesota College of Liberal Arts alumni
Johns Hopkins University faculty
Presidents of the University of Minnesota
20th-century American non-fiction writers
20th-century American male writers
American male non-fiction writers
Speechwriters for presidents of the United States
20th-century American academics
20th-century political scientists